Sugishita (written: 杉下) is a Japanese surname. Notable people with the surname include:

, Japanese footballer
, Japanese baseball player and coach

Japanese-language surnames